Oriental bazaar Altyn Asyr also known locally as Täze jygyldyk (New flea bazaar) is the largest market in Turkmenistan, and the fifth-largest in Central Asia. It is located in the outskirts of Ashgabat, in the residential area Choganly. It was built to resemble the shape a Turkmen carpet ornament of Ahal Province. The market covers 154 hectares. At the heart of the bazaar is a tall clock tower, its main landmark. There are 2,155 shops in the market.

History and architecture 
The oriental Bazaar Altyn Asyr was opened in 2011 with the participation of the President of Turkmenistan Gurbanguly Berdimuhamedov.

The new market features unique architecture. The complex resembles a carpet pattern from a bird's eye view. The bazaar includes a hotel that can accommodate a hundred guests, and there are several cafes and bistros on the grounds.

In 2013 the market was equipped with telephone equipment and high-speed Internet.

Photos of the demolished Tolkuchka bazaar

See also

Bazaar
Market (place)
Retail
Souq

References

External links

Photos and stories of Tolkuchka
Selection of photographs

Bazaars
Buildings and structures in Ashgabat
Economy of Ashgabat
Retail markets in Turkmenistan